Rajjar 1 is a town and union council in Charsadda District of Khyber-Pakhtunkhwa. It is located at 34°10'13N 71°45'18E and has an altitude of 285 metres (938 feet).

See also
 Rajjar 2

References

Union councils of Charsadda District
Populated places in Charsadda District, Pakistan